Connecticut elected its seven representatives at-large on a general ticket.

See also 
 United States House of Representatives elections, 1796 and 1797
 List of United States representatives from Connecticut

1796
Connecticut
United States House of Representatives